José Rodolfo Serpa Pérez (born 17 April 1979 in Corozal, Sucre) is a Colombian professional road racing cyclist, who last rode for UCI Continental team .

In 2006, Serpa won the individual points championship to wear the 2005–06 UCI America Tour leader's jersey and won the road race at the Pan American Championships.

Major results

2001
 2nd Team pursuit, UCI Track World Cup Classics, Cali
2002
 3rd Time trial, National Road Championships
2003
 Pan American Games
1st Individual time trial
3rd Team pursuit
 2nd Time trial, National Road Championships
2005
 3rd Time trial, National Road Championships
 6th Time trial, Pan American Road Championships
 6th Overall Vuelta a Venezuela
 7th Overall Clásico Ciclístico Banfoandes
1st Stage 5
2006
 1st Overall UCI America Tour
 Pan American Road Championships
1st  Road race
6th Time trial
 1st Time trial, Central American and Caribbean Games
 1st Overall Vuelta a Venezuela
1st Stage 4 (ITT)
 1st Stage 12 Vuelta a Colombia
 2nd Time trial, National Road Championships
 2nd Overall Vuelta al Táchira
1st Stages 7, 10 & 14 (ITT)
 4th Overall Vuelta por un Chile Líder
1st Stage 6
 6th Overall Tour de Langkawi
1st Stages 4 & 5
2007
 1st Stage 5 Vuelta al Táchira
 2nd Madison, Pan American Games
 2nd Overall Le Tour de Langkawi
1st Stage 8
 4th Overall Vuelta a Venezuela
 5th Overall Vuelta por un Chile Líder
 9th Giro di Toscana
2008
 1st Overall Clásico Ciclístico Banfoandes
1st Points classification
1st Stages 6 & 7 (ITT)
 1st Stage 9 (ITT) Vuelta a Venezuela
 1st Stage 6 Le Tour de Langkawi
 4th Overall Tour de San Luis
 8th Overall Settimana Internazionale di Coppi e Bartali
 9th Overall Giro del Trentino
2009
 1st Overall Tour de Langkawi
1st Mountains classification
1st Stage 5
 1st Stage 7 (ITT) Vuelta a Venezuela
 3rd Overall Tour de San Luis
1st Stage 4
2010
 2nd Overall Tour de San Luis
 2nd Memorial Marco Pantani
 3rd Overall Settimana Internazionale di Coppi e Bartali
1st Stage 2
 7th Overall Giro del Trentino
 8th Overall Settimana Ciclistica Lombarda
1st Stage 4
 8th GP Industria & Artigianato di Larciano
2011
 1st Giro del Friuli
 1st Stage 1b (TTT) Settimana Internazionale di Coppi e Bartali
 2nd Overall Tour de San Luis
1st Stage 2
 2nd Overall Giro della Provincia di Reggio Calabria
 2nd Overall Giro di Sardegna
 4th Overall Settimana Ciclistica Lombarda
 5th Gran Premio Città di Camaiore
 8th GP Industria & Artigianato di Larciano
 9th Giro della Romagna
2012
 1st  Overall Tour de Langkawi
1st  Mountains classification
1st Stages 5 & 6
 5th Overall Tour de San Luis
 5th Gran Premio Industria e Commercio Artigianato Carnaghese
 8th Overall Settimana Internazionale di Coppi e Bartali
2014
 1st Trofeo Laigueglia
2017
 10th Overall Vuelta a Colombia
1st Stage 7
2018
 Vuelta al Táchira
1st Mountains classification
1st Stage 9
2019
 3rd Road race, National Road Championships

Grand Tour general classification results timeline

References

External links

 
 José Serpa profile at Cycling Base

1979 births
Colombian male cyclists
Living people
Cyclists at the 2003 Pan American Games
Cyclists at the 2007 Pan American Games
Cyclists at the 2004 Summer Olympics
Cyclists at the 2008 Summer Olympics
Olympic cyclists of Colombia
Vuelta a Colombia stage winners
Vuelta a Venezuela stage winners
People from Sucre Department
Pan American Games silver medalists for Colombia
Pan American Games medalists in cycling
Central American and Caribbean Games gold medalists for Colombia
Competitors at the 2006 Central American and Caribbean Games
Central American and Caribbean Games medalists in cycling
Medalists at the 2003 Pan American Games
Medalists at the 2007 Pan American Games
20th-century Colombian people
21st-century Colombian people